Oreobates sanderi is a species of frog in the family Strabomantidae. It is found in north-western Bolivia (La Paz Department) and nearby south-eastern Peru. It is not considered threatened by the IUCN.

Description
Oreobates sanderi are medium-sized among the Oreobates; adults measure  in snout–vent length. The head is large and as wide as long; the snout is short. The dorsum is pale brown to dark brown with cream flecks; the skin is granular, with round keratinized granules and small (only some slightly enlarged), sparse, low, flat warts.

Habitat
Its natural habitat is humid montane forest, such as cloud forest (the Yungas of La Paz Department). These frogs are found on forest litter or the ground near streams.

References

sanderi
Amphibians of Bolivia
Amphibians of Peru
Amphibians of the Andes
Taxonomy articles created by Polbot
Amphibians described in 2005